The Men's under-23 road race of the 2018 UCI Road World Championships was a cycling event that took place on 28 September 2018 in Innsbruck, Austria. It was the 23rd edition of the event, for which French rider Benoît Cosnefroy was the defending champion, having won in 2017. 178 riders from 52 nations entered the competition.

The race was won by Switzerland's Marc Hirschi – becoming the first Swiss rider to win the gold medal – after he attacked from a small group on the final descent into Innsbruck, and soloed away to a fifteen-second margin of victory. The remaining members of that small group, Bjorg Lambrecht from Belgium and Finland's Jaakko Hänninen, did battle for the remaining medals, with silver going to Lambrecht and bronze to Hänninen.

Course
After , the riders crossed the finish line for the first time, before starting four laps of a circuit  in length. After a short period of flat roads, the race descended through Igls back towards Innsbruck and the finish line in front of the Tyrolean State Theatre.

Qualification
Qualification was based mainly on the UCI Under-23 Continental Rankings by nations as of 12 August 2018, with varying number on qualifications depending on the continent. In addition to this number, any rider within the top placings of the continent's elite tour ranking that was not already qualified, the outgoing World Champion and the current continental champions were also able to take part.

Qualification methods
The following nations qualified.

Continental champions

Participating nations
178 cyclists from 52 nations were entered in the men's road race. The number of cyclists per nation is shown in parentheses.

Final classification

References

External links
Road race page at Innsbruck-Tirol 2018 website

Men's under-23 road race
UCI Road World Championships – Men's under-23 road race
2018 in men's road cycling